Joseph William Andrew Hickson (1873–1956) was a Canadian psychologist and mountaineer.  As a mountaineer, he is the first to ascend 30 major peaks including Pinnacle Mountain, Mount St. Bride, Mount Chephren, Mount Sir Douglas, Mount Fifi, Mount Joffre, Mount Spring-Rice, Mount King Edward, Mount Fryatt, and Mount Robertson.

He was the son of Sir Joseph Hickson.

He was at McGill University from 1901 to 1924, latterly 13 years as professor of metaphysics and logic.

References 

1873 births
1956 deaths
Canadian mountain climbers
Canadian psychologists
Academic staff of McGill University